Starships Unlimited is a 4X real-time strategy game series. Unlike other 4X games, Starships Unlimited puts greater emphasis on starships than on colonies.

References

External links
Official Apezone site

Science fiction video games
Windows games
4X video games
Real-time strategy video games
Matrix Games games
Single-player video games